Amydria margoriella is a moth of the family Acrolophidae. It is found in North America, including Florida, Kentucky, Ohio and Texas.

The wingspan is about 11 mm.

References

Moths described in 1905
Acrolophidae